Government (Model) Senior Secondary School Dhundan, was established in 1936, in Dhundan Village of Solan, Himachal Pradesh.It is a Co-educational, English and Hindi Medium government school affiliated to the Himachal Pradesh Board of School Education, Dharamshala, from elementary (6th Grade) up to the senior secondary levels (12th Grade).

The school is accredited 'Model School' by Education department of Himachal Pradesh in April, 2017. Government of Himachal Pradesh aimed to provide facilities much better than private or public schools at much lower fee.
The school is also awarded as Swaachh School by District administration in a recent survey conducted by Education Department.

Model School Dhundan is located on Major District Road 11 in Dhundan Village in District Solan, in the state of Himachal Pradesh.

Motto 
The motto of the school is "Discipline, Devotion, Dedication".

Campus 
Model School Dhundan is located near the Major District Road 11 in Dhundan Village in District Solan, in the state of Himachal Pradesh, in northern India. It is running on self owned building by Himachal Government and have facility of playgrounds : One in the school campus and one about 500 m from the campus.

Curriculum 
The school is affiliated to the Himachal Pradesh Board of School Education, Dharamshala (HPBOSE), till the senior secondary level (+2). The curriculum follows the National Council of Educational Research and Training (NCERT) and the syllabi are framed by the Himachal Pradesh Board of School Education, Dharamshala (HPBOSE), of the Government of India. Students prepare for the All India Secondary and Senior Secondary School Examinations, conducted by the HPBOSE, Dharamshala.

The syllabus provides for and examines a student in English, Hindi, Mathematics, Science (with Practicals), and Social Science.  The school is offers Science (Medical and Non-Medical),Commerce stream and Humanities ( Arts). Information Practises (Computer) and  Physical Education are also available as optional subjects.
Vocational Courses and Subjects like Health Care & Travel&Tourism are also being taught in the school since 2016.

Classrooms & Teacher-Student Ratio 
The class-section average strength is round 25 pupils in junior classes and 30 pupils in senior classes. The teacher-student ratio is a 1:16. All classrooms are having well facilities. There are also smart-class rooms which are networked with the computer laboratory to assist teachers in conducting computer-aided-teaching (CAT) lessons.

A Virtual Classroom is also being used to teach the students.

Activities and Sports 
Children at 'Model School Dhundan' take participation in various kind of activities throughout the year. Dramatics, Debating, Elocution and Quiz contests are also regular features.

Cultural Events 
The school celebrates almost every festival and occasion. The celebrations include performances by the students like Skits, Songs, Dances, Speeches, etc.

List of Major Functions Organised 
 Girl Child Day
 Himachal Pradesh Day
 Republic Day
Mere School se Nikle Moti
 World Environment Day
 Independence Day
 Annual Function- The annual function is held every year.
 Teachers' Day
 Children's Day
 World Aids Day
 Farewell
  etc.

Sports 
The school believes in overall development of the students and thus along with academic result it focuses on Sports too. There are various sports played in the school namely Football, Table Tennis, Badminton, Kho Kho, BasketBall and other athletic games. The school also organizes various Tournaments and Events to encourage competition in the field of sports.

Interactions with other schools through sporting and cultural activities are a regular feature.

External References

In the News  
 

 

Schools in Solan district
High schools and secondary schools in Himachal Pradesh
Educational institutions established in 1936
1936 establishments in India